The Benambra National Park is a protected national park that is located  north-east of Albury,  south-east of Culcairn, and  south-west of Holbrook, New South Wales, in the South West Slopes region of New South Wales, Australia. The park is almost entirely surrounded by private land, however access can be gained by contacting the National Parks & Wildlife Service.

History
Benambra National Park was initially declared a forest reserve in 1879, and in 1918 it was reclassified as state forest. The national park was gazetted in 2001, to protect remnant areas of White Box and Red Box woodlands, which have been extensively cleared across New South Wales. The park has a history of use for grazing and small scale timber harvesting for firewood and fencing.

In 1985 the entire park was burnt, after a lightning strike started a fire north-west of the reserve, which then burnt through park and stopped on a property adjacent to the eastern boundary of the park.

Features

A large cave known as 'Morgan's Cave' exists within the park, which was reputedly used in the 1860s as a refuge by the notorious bushranger Dan Morgan.

Access
The park is almost entirely surrounded by private land. There is no public vehicle access to the park, however access to the park for activities such as bushwalking and birdwatching, can be gained by contacting the National Parks & Wildlife Service office in Tumut.

Flora
The park comprises several vegetation communities. Red Box-White Box-Dry Shrub Open Forest makes up 69 percent of the park, Red Box-Long-leaved Box Grassy Forest makes up 8 percent, Red Box Swampy Flat Woodland makes up 7 percent, Dwyer's Red Gum-Black Cypress Pine Grass Woodland makes up 5 percent, and 2 percent is Currawang Wattle-Drooping She-oak Shrubland. Woolly ragwort, listed as Vulnerable in NSW under the Biodiversity Conservation Act 2016, occurs within Benambra National Park.

Invasive plants found in the park include St. John's wort, Paterson's curse and Tree of Heaven.

Fauna
Threatened birds recorded in the park include Black-chinned honeyeater, Regent honeyeater, Grey-crowned babbler, Hooded robin, Diamond firetail, Painted honeyeater, Swift parrot, Turquoise parrot, Brown treecreeper, and Speckled warbler. Threatened mammals recorded in the park include Southeastern long-eared bat, Squirrel glider, Eastern pygmy possum and Yellow-footed antechinus. Reptiles found in the park include the Yellow-faced whipsnake.

Several introduced pest species occur, including the European fox, feral goat, feral cat and European rabbit.

See also

 Protected areas of New South Wales
 List of national parks of Australia

References

National parks of New South Wales
Protected areas established in 2001
2001 establishments in Australia